The Eighth East Asia Summit was held in Bandar Seri Begawan, Brunei on October 9–10, 2013. The East Asia Summit is an annual meeting of national leaders from the East Asian region and adjoining countries.

Attending delegations
The heads of state and heads of government of eighteen countries took part in the summit.

Agenda

Outcomes
Russian President Vladimir Putin did not attend and was represented by Foreign Minister Sergei Lavrov. US President Barack Obama did not attend due to the United States federal government shutdown of 2013 and was represented by Secretary of State John Kerry. The other members' leaders attended.

References

2013 conferences
2013 in international relations
21st-century diplomatic conferences (Asia-Pacific)
ASEAN meetings
2013 in Brunei
Bandar Seri Begawan
October 2013 events in Asia